Pucka can refer to:

 Púca, a creature of Irish folklore
 Alternative spelling of pukka